Eternal is the twenty-eighth studio album released by The Isley Brothers on DreamWorks Records on August 7, 2001. Now popular again with audiences, almost single-handledly for Ronald Isley's "Mr. Biggs" persona, Eternal included production from not only R. Kelly who gave the Isleys their biggest hit as leading artists in over two decades with "Contagious" but also from Jimmy Jam & Terry Lewis, Raphael Saadiq and Ronald's wife at the time, Angela Winbush. Based on the mega-success of "Contagious", Eternal peaked at #3 on the Billboard Billboard Top 200 album charts and #1 on the R&B album chart selling over two million copies having it certified double-platinum. The first album the Isleys released as a duo in over a decade (the first as Ronald and Ernie), Marvin Isley left the group after suffering a bout with diabetes, which later caused both of his legs to be amputated), Ernie Isley also showcase his talents as a guitarist in songs like "Move Your Body" and the aptly titled "Ernie's Jam" while Ronald was still as vocally strong on this album as he had been throughout the Isley Brothers' legendary catalogue.

Track listing

Notes
  denotes co-producer

Personnel

Ronald Isley – Lead and Background Vocals, Executive Producer
Ernie Isley – Guitar
Donnie Lyle – Bass, Guitar
Peter Mokran – Engineer
Neil Pogue – Mixing
Alex Richbourg – Percussion, Drum Programming
Louil Silas, Jr. – Executive Producer
Angela Winbush – Keyboards, Producer, Drum Programming, Vocals
Tony Flores – Assistant Engineer
Michelle Lynn Forbes – Assistant Engineer
Raphael Saadiq – Bass, Background Vocals, Producer, Guitar
Chris Bellman – Mastering
Bradley Yoast – Assistant Engineer
Jake and the Phatman – Drum Programming
Kelvin Wooten – Keyboards
Andre Harris – Producer
James "Big Jim" Wright – Keyboards, Background Vocals

Jeff Vereb – Engineer
Avant – Background Vocals
Jill Scott – Background Vocals
Vidal Davis – Producer, Engineer
Clint Roth – Engineer
Andy Gallas – Assistant
Ian Mereness – Programming, Engineer
Kevin Guarnieri – Engineer, Digital Editing, Assistant Engineer
Nick Monson – Assistant Engineer
Gary Brown – Engineer
The Johnson Sisters – Background Vocals
R. Kelly – Arranger, Producer
Paulinho Da Costa – Percussion
Steve Hodge – Engineer, Mixing
Steve Huff – Producer, Instrumentation
Jimmy Jam – Arranger, Producer, Keyboards
Terry Lewis – Arranger, Producer, Instrumentation

Charts

Certifications

References

2001 albums
Albums produced by Angela Winbush
Albums produced by R. Kelly
Albums produced by Raphael Saadiq
Albums produced by Ronald Isley
The Isley Brothers albums
DreamWorks Records albums